Bromocyclopentane is an alkyl halide with the chemical formula C5H9Br.  It is a colorless to light yellow liquid at standard temperature and pressure.

Bromocyclopentane is a building block used in the synthesis of filaminast.

Bromocyclopentane is reacted with magnesium turnings in dry tetrahydrofuran making cyclopentyl Grignard reagent, a main precursor in the synthesis of Ketamine. 

Organobromides
Cyclopentyl compounds